Elise Simone Ashton ( Norwood, born 18 June 1981 in Sydney) is a former captain of the Australian women's water polo team. She is a right-handed utility and played her 100th international game on 20 August 2005 against the Netherlands during the FINA World League Final series in Kirishi, Russia.

Elise is the fifth of the six daughters of Pam and Russell Norwood. Her other sisters (Justine Norwood, Danielle Stephens, Belinda Elliott, Christy Venning, and Amber Slater) are all accomplished in their own fields, including veterinary practices, school teaching, medical practices, and community service.

Ashton has played for Sydney University teams since she was 13 years old, but is now retired, and is currently enjoying working and surfing in Australia. She was a member of national and New South Wales junior teams before being selected for the senior team in 2001. Her achievements include a gold medal at the 2002 Commonwealth Championships, Manchester, England and 4th place at the 2004 Olympic Games, Athens, Greece. She was married in 2005 to Chris Ashton.

Since then, Mr and Mrs Ashton have become the parents of two children, Annabel and Thomas (Tommy), who are now 12 and 10 years old respectively.

References

External links
 
 
 

1981 births
Living people
Australian female water polo players
Olympic water polo players of Australia
Water polo players at the 2004 Summer Olympics
Sportswomen from New South Wales
Water polo players from Sydney
20th-century Australian women
21st-century Australian women